Crăsnișoara is the Romanian name for two villages in Storozhynets Raion, Ukraine:

Crăsnișoara Nouă, or Nova Krasnoshora village in Chudei Commune
Crăsnișoara Veche, or Stara Krasnoshora Commune